Simsky (masculine), Simskaya (feminine), or Simskoye (neuter) is the name of several rural localities in the Republic of Bashkortostan, Russia:
Simsky (rural locality), a village in Sakhayevsky Selsoviet of Karmaskalinsky District
Simskoye (rural locality), a selo in Austrumsky Selsoviet of Iglinsky District